UCPB may refer to:

United Civic Party of Belarus
United Coconut Planters Bank, a Philippine bank